Action Dad is a 2011 Brazilian-American animated series created by Andrew Dickman. It was produced by Animation Development Company and Toonzone Studios. The show features the voices of Chelan Simmons, Lee Tockar and Michael Donovan. The show premiered in Brazil on September 12, 2012 on Cartoon Network Brazil. The show has also aired in Portugal, Israel and France. Although previously thought to premiere in mid-2011, the show has yet to be distributed in the United States .

Plot 

The story revolves around Liz Ramsey (Chelan Simmons) and her little brother Mick  Ramsey (Ashleigh Ball in the series, Joel McFarlene in the pilot), two normal teenagers with one exception; their father Chuck Ramsey (Michael Donovan in the series, Maurice LaMarche in the original pitched pilot) is a secret spy and their mother Angela Ramsey (Sarah Johns) is a super-villain. Although the two parents work for both good and evil, they have the same intention of keeping their children out of harm from their missions and enemies.

Cast 

 Chelan Simmons as Liz Ramsey
 Ashleigh Ball as Mick Ramsey
 Michael Donovan as Chuck Ramsey
 Sarah Johns as Angela Ramsey
 Lee Tockar as Various
 Ian James Corlett as Baron Von Dash
 Peter Kelamis as Shortcut, Prince Eyeball, H.Q. Voice, Alam Voice, Director, Computor
 Trevor Devall as Nun Chuck
 Paul Dobson as Glass Jaw
 Cole Howard as Jack Poundpenny

Characters

Ramsey Family

 Chuck Ramsey: Agent Ramsey is the best Agent of the headquarters S.H.H.H.H.H (Super hollow fact heroic fighter Humatizados), manages to overcome some missions and most of them is to combat Von dash, is married to Angela although they fight one-on-one.
 Angela Ramsey: Angela or agent mother is a beautiful agent of the improvement of A.R.G.H (Association of Repressive Gangsters skilled) headquarters, she worked alongside Baron Von Dash although sometimes betrays it to protect her family.
 Liz Ramsey: Liz Ramsey is the eldest daughter of Chuck and Angela, Liz is good in combat techniques, when you want to do things for older people learn to drive, get a boyfriend or be in an appointment, Chuck hardly leaves Her to do those things.
 Mick Ramsey: Mick Ramsey is the youngest son of Chuck and Angela, Mick is very smart, knows a lot about robotics and sometimes assists parents in their dangerous missions from the home, is not very good physically, but is good with his mind.

S.H.H.H.H.H 

 Major Break: Major Break is the Commander of the barracks of S.H.H.H.H.H, gives orders to all agents, considered Chuck Ramsey as his right hand and leads to Slam McJackson and PoundPenny to fight against A.R.G.H.
 Slam McJackson: Slam McJackson is the one That handles the controls of S.H.H.H.H.H being very adventurous and sometimes helps Chuck in their missions from the barracks when it comes to the danger.
 Ms. PoundPenny: Ms. PoundPenny is one of the agents of S.H.H.H.H.H and the only female agent of the barracks. She helps with the coordinates of the headquarters and has a son named Jack who is the love of Liz Ramsey.

A.R.G.H 

 Baron Von Dash: Von Dash is an agent of A.R.G.H that helps agent mother Against S.H.H.H.H.H but most of the time fails due to agent Ramsey or dur to his own Incompetence He is very clumsy.

Episodes 

 "Agent of MEH" – 17 September 2012
 "Double Agent Double Date" – 18 September 2012
 "Getting Schooled" – 19 September 2012
 "Family Von Dash" – 20 September 2012
 "Made of Dishonor" – 21 September 2012
 "World of Workcraft" – 24 September 2012
 "Old Agent" – 25 September 2012
 "Action Ramp" – 26 September 2012
 "2 Buff Chuck" – 27 September 2012
 "Chuck Goes to Hollywood" – 28 September 2012
 "Chuck in The Middle" – 1 October 2012
 "Agent Gone Child" – 2 October 2012
 "It's A Mall World" – 3 October 2012
 "Shrinky Fink" – 4 October 2012
 "Girl Powerless" – 5 October 2012
 "Thugz Bunny" – 8 October 2012
 "Time Drivel" – 9 October 2012
 "Mad Magazine" – 10 October 2012
 "Xendra Freelance Agent" – 11 October 2012
 "Giant Crop of Horror" – 12 October 2012
 "Stop & Shoot the Rose" – 15 October 2012
 "Curl Scout" – 16 October 2012

Production 

Dickman came up with the concept for the show as early as 2006, wanting to make a family orientated show. On the matter he said "I used to LOVE old action hero movies (which were also comedies sometimes) that starred either Hulk Hogan, Arnold Schwartzenegger and etc... I miss those old movies, I wanted to see if I could bring that back, a little with this cartoon" However, Dickman had no involvement in the production of the series, nor was he acknowledged of the show's existence until he discovered it five years later and wasn't even contractually paid for the series at all.  Dickman believes that the reason for being off the production was for the studio "to make all the changes they wanted." This may explain why the series' main antagonist, Baron Gash, was renamed to Baron von Dash and the characters gained new character designs.

References 

International Cartoon Network original programming